Blooming is the first compilation album by Ami Suzuki as a disc jockey, released on July 21, 2010. Blooming is the first mixtape album by Ami Suzuki under the name "DJ Ami Suzuki".

The album includes songs that Suzuki plays in her DJ sets since 2009 in a non-stop format, including various popular house songs by several overseas artists, and songs from Japanese artists as well, specially those related to Avex's "House Nation" movement. The English version of "Kiss Kiss Kiss" was the only song performed by Suzuki that was included in the album.

Track listing

Personnel
Art Direction, Design – Masaru Yoshikawa
Mixing – DJ Ami Suzuki
Mastering – Rena Koyanagi

References

Ami Suzuki albums
2010 remix albums
Avex Group remix albums